The Leader of the Opposition of the Australian Capital Territory, is an official role usually occupied by the leader of the second largest party or coalition in the Australian Capital Territory Legislative Assembly. The title is conferred under Standing Order 5A of the ACT Legislative Assembly, that the Leader of the Opposition shall be the leader of the largest non-Government party, with the consent of that member. In the event of an equal number of members of the second largest party, the Assembly shall vote and elect a Leader of the Opposition.

List of Opposition Leaders of the Australian Capital Territory

References

Opposition
Australian Capital Territory